Incurvatus in se (Latin for "turned/curved inward on oneself") is a theological phrase describing a life lived "inward" for oneself rather than "outward" for God and others.

Overview
Paul the Apostle wrote of this condition in the Epistle to the Romans , :

It was perhaps Augustine of Hippo who first coined the phrase incurvatus in se. Martin Luther expounded on this in his Lectures on Romans and described this state as:

This was later extended by Karl Barth to include other sins beyond pride. It is also believed that, even though people are justified by Jesus dying on the Cross, they still possess a propensity to sin against God because of this condition (i.e. simul justus et peccator).

See also
Hubris
Theology of the Cross

References

External links
The Catholic Luther, an article quoting Luther's use of incurvatus in se.

Christian terminology
Latin religious words and phrases
Lutheran theology
Martin Luther